Marinko Koljanin (born 17 November 1957) is a Croatian football manager, a former footballer and a former general manager of HNK Rijeka who was manager of Al-Nasr in Oman Professional League.

Managerial career
Koljanin worked as an assistant to Otto Barić at Casino Salzburg and was on the bench during the club's 1994 UEFA Cup final loss when Barić was suspended. He later worked in the Middle East before taking up his first coaching job in Croatia with Krk in December 2013.

He left his role of vice-president of Orijent to replace Edo Flego as manager of the club's senior team in May 2022.

References

External links
Die Legionärs-Liste. Österreichische Fußballarbeiter im Ausland. Teil 4: Coaches und Free Agents - FM4ORF.at
 

1957 births
Living people
Association football goalkeepers
Yugoslav footballers
Croatian footballers
HNK Orijent players
Croatian football managers
SK Vorwärts Steyr managers
LASK managers
Kazma SC managers
Al-Sahel SC (Kuwait) managers
Al-Hazm FC managers
Al-Nasr S.C.S.C. managers
HNK Orijent managers
Saudi First Division League managers
Kuwait Premier League managers
Croatian expatriate football managers
Expatriate football managers in Kuwait
Croatian expatriate sportspeople in Kuwait
Expatriate football managers in Saudi Arabia
Croatian expatriate sportspeople in Saudi Arabia
Expatriate football managers in Jordan
Croatian expatriate sportspeople in Jordan
Expatriate football managers in Oman
Croatian expatriate sportspeople in Oman
FC Red Bull Salzburg non-playing staff
HNK Rijeka non-playing staff
Association football goalkeeping coaches